Coto Makassar or Coto Mangkasara (Makassarese), is an Indonesian traditional soup originating from Makassar, South Sulawesi. It is a variant of  soto traditional beef and offal stew with seasoned broth made from ground peanuts and spices. The main ingredient of this soup is beef and it can be mixed with innards such as intestine, liver, lungs, heart, tripe, or cow brain.

Coto Makassar is usually served with Burasa or Ketupat rice cakes.

See also

Soto ayam
Sop saudara, spicy Bugis-Makassar beef soup.
Konro, Bugis-Makassar spicy cow's ribs soup, similar or related to ribs soto
Tongseng, Javanese spicy mutton soup also related to soto
Gulai, the Javanese gulai is soupy, similar to mutton or goat soto but slightly different in spices
 List of Indonesian soups
 List of soups

References

Makassar cuisine
Indonesian soups